Kirill Viktorovich Bozhenov (born 7 December 2000) is a Russian football player. He plays for Dynamo Makhachkala on loan from Rostov. His primary position is right midfielder or right winger, he also played right back in the past.

Club career
He made his debut in the Russian Football National League for FC Khimki on 8 September 2018 in a game against FC Zenit-2 Saint Petersburg as an 86th-minute substitute for Aleksandr Kozlov. He made his first start on 28 October 2018 in a game against FC Chertanovo Moscow.

He made his Russian Premier League debut for FC Khimki on 8 August 2020 in a game against PFC CSKA Moscow.

On 18 May 2021, he signed a 5-year contract with FC Rostov.

On 15 July 2021, he returned to FC Khimki on loan for the 2021–22 season. He returned to Rostov in December 2021. He was loaned back to Khimki on 22 February 2022. The loan was extended for the 2022–23 season.

Career statistics

References

External links
 
 
 
 Profile by Russian Football National League

2000 births
Sportspeople from Barnaul
Living people
Russian footballers
Russia youth international footballers
Russia under-21 international footballers
Association football midfielders
FC Khimki players
FC Rostov players
FC Dynamo Makhachkala players
Russian Premier League players
Russian First League players
Russian Second League players